Rubén Sánchez Pérez-Cejuela (born 25 November 1994) is a Spanish footballer who plays for Uzbekistan Super League club AGMK as a forward.

Club career
Born in Sonseca, Toledo, Castile-La Mancha, Sánchez graduated from CD Toledo's youth setup, after stints at AD Diana and CD Sonseca. After appearing with the former's reserve team, he made his first team debut on 25 August 2013 by coming on as a substitute for Rufino in a 1–3 Segunda División B away loss against UB Conquense.

Sánchez scored his first and only goal for Toledo on 1 September 2013, netting a last-minute equalizer in a 1–1 home draw against SD Huesca. The following 25 July, he renewed his contract until 2017, but remained assigned to the B-side; he was only promoted to the main squad in August 2015.

On 18 July 2016 Sánchez joined another reserve team, Sporting de Gijón B in Tercera División. After scoring ten goals in only 18 matches (which included braces against CD Praviano and CD Mosconia in October), he made his first team debut on 21 December, replacing Burgui and scoring his team's only in a 1–3 loss at SD Eibar for the season's Copa del Rey.

Sánchez made his La Liga debut on 7 January 2017, again from the bench in a 0–1 away loss against UD Las Palmas. On 7 July he moved to another reserve team, Granada CF B in the third division.

References

External links

Fútbol Manchego profile 

1994 births
Living people
Sportspeople from the Province of Toledo
Spanish footballers
Footballers from Castile and León
Association football forwards
La Liga players
Segunda División B players
Tercera División players
CD Toledo players
Sporting de Gijón B players
Sporting de Gijón players
Club Recreativo Granada players
CF Rayo Majadahonda players